Hocine Fenier (born 5 March 1983) is an Algerian footballer who plays for MC Saïda in the Algerian Ligue Professionnelle 1.

External links 
 

1983 births
Living people
People from Taher
Algerian footballers
Algeria international footballers
CR Belouizdad players
CS Constantine players
USM Annaba players
MC Saïda players
Algerian Ligue Professionnelle 1 players
Association football forwards
21st-century Algerian people